The Limmern Glacier is a glacier situated in the Glarus Alps in the canton of Glarus in Switzerland. The glacier is situated below the mountains of Bifertenstock, to the south, and Schiben, to the north. Meltwater from the glacier flows eastwards into the Limmernsee and thence north into the Linth river.

See also
List of glaciers in Switzerland
Swiss Alps

References

External links
Swiss glacier monitoring network

Glaciers of Switzerland